This is a list of erotic films released in the 2010s. These films include core elements of erotic filmography, but can cross into other genres. They have been released to a cinema audience by the mainstream commercial film industry and are widely distributed with reviews by reputable critics. Pornographic films, which are produced by specialized pornographic film studios as opposed to mainstream film studios, should not be included in this list. Erotic thrillers are listed on a separate page.

See also
 List of erotic films

References

 
Lists of erotic films by decade
E
Lists of films by genre by decade